Genesar is a historic home located near Berlin, Worcester County, Maryland, United States. It is a -story brick dwelling. It represents the hold-over forms of medieval work and the earliest development towards the more formal Georgian ideals in plan and design.

Genesar was listed on the National Register of Historic Places in 1971.

References

External links
, including photo from 1969, at Maryland Historical Trust

Houses in Worcester County, Maryland
Houses on the National Register of Historic Places in Maryland
Historic American Buildings Survey in Maryland
Houses completed in 1732
National Register of Historic Places in Worcester County, Maryland